Sufian (also Romanized as Şūfīān, Şūfeyān, and Sūfiyān) is a village in Arandan Rural District, in the Central District of Sanandaj County, Kurdistan Province, Iran. At the 2006 census, its population was 271, in 62 families. The village is populated by Kurds.

References 

Towns and villages in Sanandaj County
Kurdish settlements in Kurdistan Province